Halvor Birch (21 February 1885 – 5 July 1962) was a Danish gymnast who competed in the 1906 Summer Olympics and in the 1912 Summer Olympics.

At the 1906 Summer Olympics in Athens, he was a member of the Danish gymnastics team, which won the silver medal. Six years later he won the bronze medal in the gymnastics men's team, free system event.

References

External links
profile

1885 births
1962 deaths
Danish male artistic gymnasts
Gymnasts at the 1906 Intercalated Games
Gymnasts at the 1912 Summer Olympics
Olympic gymnasts of Denmark
Olympic silver medalists for Denmark
Olympic bronze medalists for Denmark
Olympic medalists in gymnastics
Medalists at the 1912 Summer Olympics
Medalists at the 1906 Intercalated Games